Piz Arpschella is a mountain of the Albula Alps, located west of Zernez in Graubünden. The mountain is situated between the Val Grialetsch and the Val Sarsura.

References

External links
 Piz Arpschella on Hikr

Mountains of Switzerland
Mountains of the Alps
Alpine three-thousanders
Mountains of Graubünden
Zernez